Avezzano ( or) is a city and comune with a population of 40,752 inhabitants, situated in the Abruzzo region, province of L'Aquila, Italy. It is the second most populous municipality in the province and the sixth in the region. Avezzano was documented as an existing urban center in the ninth century. The city was destroyed by the earthquake of 1915. It was rebuilt after the 1944 Allied bombing. The city was decorated with the silver medal for civil merit, an award granted by the Italian Republic.

It is the main commercial, industrial and agricultural centre of the Marsica area, with important high-tech industries and a large Telespazio satellite farm (Fucino Space Centre).

History

Toponymy
There are different common etymologies for the name of the city: from "Ad Vetianum" which means a "to the Vetia family"; from "Avidianum" or "fundus Avidianus" which is derived from the noble Avidius domiciled in the nearby town of Alba Fucens or from "Ave Jane", an invocation to the Roman god Janus.

Earliest history

The presence of hunters dates back to the palaeolithic period about 18,000 to 14,000 years ago. There are several sites that bear witness to the presence of humans in prehistoric times, as in the Cave of Ciccio Felice located just south of Avezzano.
The first major settlements in this area began with the construction works for the lake's drainage ordered by Emperor Claudius in the first century A.D.

Middle Ages
In 591 in the area came under the control of Ariulf and the duchy of Spoleto. Charlemagne, after the mid-700s, donated Gastald of the Marsi and all the lands of the duchy to the papal states. So originated the county of the Marsi.
In the late middle ages the victory of Charles of Anjou led to the destruction of Albe and Pietraquaria whose people had sided in favor of Conradin,  duke of Swabia, defeated after the battle of Tagliacozzo in 1268.
In the fourteenth century in Avezzano ended the process of aggregation of the various villages that make up the urban center.

Early modern
In the 15th century Avezzano was under Gentile Virginio Orsini, who built the castle in 1490. In the fifteenth century occurred the victory of the Colonna family over Orsini. Their lordship lasted about three centuries. The castle of Avezzano in 1565 was expanded by Marcantonio Colonna and was later converted into a fortified palace.

Late modern and contemporary
Avezzano once lay on the shores of the largest lake in peninsular Italy, Lake Fucino, which was drained in the late 19th century. After the draining of the Lake, wide fields became available for cultivation and the area underwent terrific growth. It was completely destroyed by one of the worst recorded earthquakes in the history of Italy on the early morning of January 13, 1915, with only Palazzi's house and a wing of Orsini-Colonna castle spared. More than 30,000 people died.
The town streets were then completely rebuilt along straight, parallel lines, with wide green areas and villas in the Liberty style.

During World War I and World War II, a concentration camp was located near the city, where foreign war prisoners were interned. During World War II, Avezzano was liberated by elements of the New Zealand Army (2nd New Zealand Division) on 10 June 1944.

Geography

The city is located north-west of the Fucino. It is dominated in the north by Mount Velino and west by Mount Salviano. Avezzano is considered "the city territory" of Marsica, Abruzzo sub-region that includes 37 municipalities, for a total of about 134,000 inhabitants. 
The city is located about 100 kilometers east of Rome, 110 km west of Pescara and 55 km south of L'Aquila.

Topography
The urban center of the old city revolves around the Castello Orsini-Colonna (''Orsini-Colonna Castle''). To the east the territory extends to the villages of San Pelino and Paterno. It is situated between 695 meters s.l.m. in the urban sector and 740 meters in the north, the land of which is a slight uphill slope to the north-northwest.

Neighbourhoods (alphabetical order): Barbazzano, Borgo Angizia, Borgo Pineta, Centro città, Cesolino, Chiusa Resta, Cupello, I Frati, La Pulcina, San Rocco, San Nicola, Sant'Andrea, Scalzagallo, Via Napoli.

Climate
Because of its geographical location, situated as it is in the former bed of the Fucino and surrounded by towering hills, Avezzano is characterized by a Mediterranean mountain climate. Based on climatic averages for the period 1951–2000 published by the agency ARSSA  (Regione Abruzzo), and climatic averages related to thirty years of reference 1961–1990, the average temperature of the coldest month, January stood at +2,0 °C; that of the hottest month, August, +20.5 °C. In summer sometimes temperatures exceed 30 °C.
The Climate classification is: Zone E, 2561 GR / G.

Main sights

The city, having been completely destroyed by the earthquake of 1915, has no monuments of particular interest as do other locations in the region of Abruzzo. However, you can see some important remains of its ancient history.

Orsini-Colonna Castle

The castle was built in 1490 by Gentile Virginio Orsini, who had it built around a pre-existing medieval tower of the twelfth century; it is square, with round towers at the angles. The castle project was  probably led by the engineer Francesco di Giorgio Martini. In the sixteenth century the castle was expanded by the order of Marcantonio Colonna, becoming an elegant residence. Severely damaged by the earthquake of 1915, it was partially restored after 1990.

Tunnels of Claudius

The tunnels are located south of the city. They were built by the emperor Claudius between 41 and 52 AD by which the emperor made the first attempts at draining the huge Lake Fucino. To create the tunnels and the main gallery, 25,000 slaves were needed.  They dug 32 wells and six tunnels. The lake was largely drained, but with the fall of the Roman Empire the tunnels were obstructed and the lake returned to its previous levels. Many centuries later, Alessandro Torlonia completed the work by finally draining Lake Fucino, building on the original project of the emperor Claudius and turning the land under the great lake into a fertile plain. In 1977, the tunnels were opened as an archaeological park.

Cathedral of San Bartolomeo 

The Cathedral of St. Bartholomew was built in 1000 and documented in the thirteenth century. After its destruction as a result of the earthquake of 1915, it was rebuilt after 1940 in the new central square of Avezzano. The facade is neo-Renaissance travertine. The three portals are topped with mosaics depicting Christ and the two protectors of Avezzano, the Virgin Mary and St. Bartholomew. The church inside presents three large naves and a valuable organ placed in the church in 1955.

Sanctuary of the Madonna di Pietraquaria

The original church was destroyed by Charles I of Anjou after the battle of Tagliacozzo in 1268 and rebuilt a few centuries later. In 1915, it did not suffer serious damage and was home to many survivors of the quake.

Alba Fucens

7 kilometers north of the city is situated the Roman archaeological site of Alba Fucens.
It was founded by Rome as a Latin colony between 304 and 303 BC in the territory of the Aequi, on the frontier of the Marsi, in a strategic position. It is on a hill just north of the Tiburtina-Valeria, the ancient road from Rome to the Adriatic regions. Excavations were carried out since 1949 by the University of Leuven in Belgium, led by professor Fernand De Visscher.

Nature reserve of Mount Salviano

The nature reserve, established in 1999, covers 722 hectares west of the town of Avezzano on Mount Salviano. It has a rich variety of plants and different animal species that characterize its fauna and flora. At the center of the reserve is located the Sanctuary of the Madonna of Pietraquaria surrounded by numerous trails frequented by sportsmen and nature lovers.

 Fucine Inlet
 Torlonia Palace
 Torlonia Square 
 Church of San Giovanni
 Liberty Justice Palace

Economy

Agriculture

Many farms in the plain of Fucino are distinguished by the quality of the vegetables. Particularly popular is the Fucino potato which obtained the recognition of the quality label "Protected Geographical Indication". Several qualities of vegetables: carrot highland Fucino (PGI), radishes, salads and all kinds of horticultural products. In Abruzzo, 25% of agricultural GDP comes from Fucino plain.

Industry
Built in the 1970s just outside the city in the direction of Luco dei Marsi, the industrial park includes numerous industrial and manufacturing enterprises and is the economic engine of the province. Among these are Micron Technology and L-Foundry, electronics giants engaged in highly specialized manufacturing. Around 1,600 workers are employed at the fabrication center "Innovation & Technology" in Avezzano. Also located here are Arab TV, Kidco, the Burgo group, FIAMM, Saes, Presider, Presafer and several other specialized firms.
Nearby in the Fucino plain is located the Telespazio satellite farm, one of the major global operators of satellite services.

Commerce
Commerce plays a very important role for the city in retail trade, digital service industries and traditional service industries. Large commercial areas are located on the Tiburtina Valeria street, between Roma street and Cappelle dei Marsi and along XX Settembre street, just outside the city. The so-called "natural shopping center" consists of the activities in the city center.

Tourism
Near Avezzano there are parks, valleys, cities and the natural environment of the Abruzzi mountains: National Park of Abruzzo, Lazio and Molise, Sirente-Velino Regional Park, Fucino plain, Mount Velino, Ovindoli, Tagliacozzo, Giovenco valley, Roveto valley and Cavaliere plain.

Sports
The football squad is Avezzano Calcio who play at the Stadio dei Marsi. 
The rugby team is Avezzano Rugby.

Notable people

 Daniel Ciofani, football player
 Paola Concia, politician
 Felice Orlandi, actor
 Ada Gentile, pianist and composer
 Lino Guanciale, actor
 Gianni Letta, politician and journalist
 Mario Pescante, politician and sports manager
 Vito Taccone, cyclist

International relations 
 
Avezzano is twinned with:
 Ayacucho, Peru, for the sustainable development of protected areas near to urban areas 
 Belén, Argentina, for cooperation and exchange of tourism, export and import food industry
 Câmpulung Moldovenesc, Romania, for cooperation and exchange of tourism
 Santa María, Argentina, for cooperation and exchange of tourism, export and import food industry

See also
 Cathedral of San Bartolomeo
 Fucine Lake
 Marsica
 Orsini-Colonna Castle
 Roman Catholic Diocese of Avezzano
 Festival Cinema e Ambiente Avezzano

References

Bibliography

External links

 Institutional website Comune di Avezzano 
 Weather forecast Ministero della difesa – Aeronautica 

 
Cities and towns in Abruzzo
Cities destroyed by earthquakes
Marsica